James Siegel (born 1954) is an American thriller novelist.  He holds a B.A. from the York College 1977, City University of New York, and lives in Manhattan and Sag Harbor, NY.

Siegel worked for many years as an advertising executive in New York City, with writing credits from the "Yo, Yao" ad that aired during Super Bowl XXXVII, and was Vice Chairman of the Board of Directors of BBDO New York.  Since leaving commercial advertising in 2006, he has been responsible for many political advertisements from Eliot Spitzer's gubernatorial campaign in New York in 2006 to Hillary Clinton's Presidential campaign in 2008.  He continues to work in politics today.

The movie Derailed, a film based on his 2003 novel of the same name, was released on October 21, 2005. The novel was also adapted as the Tamil film Pachaikili Muthucharam.

In 2009, Siegel teamed up with stem cell advocate Brooke Ellison and directed the award-winning documentary "Hope Deferred".

In September 2013, Siegel married Laura Miller and lives with his two sons, Sander and Zachary.

Bibliography
Epitaph (2001)
Derailed (2003)
Detour (2005)
Deceit (2006)
Storyteller (2011)

References

External links
James Siegel biography

Living people
York College, City University of New York alumni
21st-century American novelists
American male novelists
American thriller writers
American documentary film directors
21st-century American male writers
1954 births